The 1968 South African Grand Prix, formally the 2nd AA Grand Prix of South Africa (Afrikaans: Tweede AA Suid-Afrikaanse Grand Prix), was a Formula One motor race held at Kyalami Circuit on Monday 1 January 1968. It was race 1 of 12 in both the 1968 World Championship of Drivers and the 1968 International Cup for Formula One Manufacturers. The 80-lap race was won by two time World Drivers' Champion and 1965 Indianapolis 500 winner Jim Clark for Lotus-Ford after starting from pole position. The race is significant as not only the last Formula One race to be won by Clark, but also the last in which he ever competed, due to his fatal crash at the Hockenheimring in Germany three months later. At this race Team Gunston became the first Formula One team to paint their cars in the livery of their sponsors instead of national colours when they entered a private Brabham for John Love and an LDS for Sam Tingle.

This was also Mike Spence's final race, as he too was killed a few months later, while practising for the 1968 Indianapolis 500.

The first six slots on the grid were filled by either previous or future world champions. However the reigning champion, Denny Hulme, only started in ninth.

Clark broke many records during the weekend, such as leading the most Grands Prix (43), having the most laps led (1,943), having the most perfect weekends (11), achieving the most pole positions (33) and finally achieving 25 race wins, beating Juan Manuel Fangio's 11-year-old record.

Classification

Qualifying 

The qualifying session was held on 31 December 1967.

Race

Championship standings after the race

Drivers' Championship standings

Constructors' Championship standings

References

Further reading

Walthert, Matthew (7 April 2015). "Going Out on Top: The Story of Jim Clark's Final Formula 1 Race". Bleacher Report. Retrieved 16 February 2016.

South African Grand Prix
Grand Prix
South African Grand Prix
January 1968 sports events in Africa